Charles, Charlie, or Chuck Carter may refer to:

Arts and entertainment
Charles Thomas Carter (c. 1735–1804), Irish composer and organist
Charles Joseph Carter (1874–1936), American stage magician
Charlton Heston (J. Charles Carter, 1923–2008), American film actor, known in private life as Charles or Chuck Carter
Chuck Carter (born 1957), video game and film artist

Politics and law
Charles Carter (New Zealand politician) (1822–1896), philanthropist, contractor, and politician

Charles Carter (of Cleve) (1707–1764), Virginia planter and politician
Charles Carter (of Ludlow) (1732–1796), son of Charles Carter (of Cleve), Virginia planter and politician
Charles Hill Carter (1732–1806), Virginia planter (at Shirley and Coromotan) and politician
Charles Carter (Alaska politician) (1870–1961), Alaskan politician, mayor of Juneau
Charles Bonham-Carter (1876–1955), British Army officer and Governor of Malta
Charles D. Carter (1868–1929), U.S. Representative from Oklahoma
Charles Newell Carter (born 1967), American politician from North Carolina
Charles Samuel Carter (1878–1968), Virginia banker and Democratic party leader, chair of State Commission on Conservation and Development

Sports
Charles B. Carter (1880–1927), American football player, lawyer and politician
Kid Carter (Charles Carter, fl. 1903–1906), American baseball player
Charlie Carter (cricketer) (born 1947), English cricketer
Charlie Carter (born 1971), Irish hurler
Charlie Carter (footballer) (born 1996), English footballer

Others
Charles Henry Carter (1828–1914), English Baptist missionary to Ceylon
Charles John Carter (died 1851), English architect and surveyor 
Charles Frederick Carter (1919–2002), English economist and university administrator
Charles Howard Carter (1927–1990), American professor of history